The Kizuna Bridge is a bridge on the Mekong River in the city of Kampong Cham, Kampong Cham Province.

It was opened in 2001 and was the first bridge to be built over the Mekong river in Cambodia.

Construction
Construction of the bridge was funded by a $56-million grant from the Japanese government. At 1500 metres it was the longest bridge in Cambodia until the 2002 construction of the Koh Kong Bridge, a 1900-metre Thai-Cambodian bridge in Koh Kong. The Kizuna bridge links eastern and western Cambodia by road for the first time. Construction of the bridge began in 1999 and took three years to complete. An estimated 10,000 people crowded the bridge for the opening ceremony.

Gallery

Notes

References

Road bridges in Cambodia
Buildings and structures in Kampong Cham province
Bridges over the Mekong River
Bridges completed in 2001
Cambodia–Japan relations